Achampet (Assembly constituency) is an SC (Scheduled Caste) reserved constituency of the Telangana Legislative Assembly in India. It is one of 4 constituencies in the Nagarkurnool district of Telangana. It is part of Nagarkurnool Lok Sabha constituency.

Guvvala Balaraju of Telangana Rashtra Samithi is the MLA from the constituency.

Mandals
The Assembly Constituency presently comprises the following Mandals:

Members of Legislative Assembly

Election results

2018

2014

2009

See also
 List of constituencies of Telangana Legislative Assembly

References

Assembly constituencies of Telangana
Mahbubnagar district